Henry Tate (27 October 1873 - 6 June 1926) was an Australian poet and musician.

Henry Tate was born in Prahran, Melbourne, the son of Henry Tate, an accountant. He was educated at a local state school and as a choir boy at a St Kilda Anglican church, and learned music under Marshall Hall. He worked as a clerk before becoming a music teacher. Tate had fewer pupils than he might, however, for he would not encourage a child with no talent, and did not believe in coaching children for music examinations.

Literary work
Tate contributed verse to The Bulletin and other journals, and wrote a weekly chess column for a Melbourne newspaper. He coined the term "fairy chess" in 1914. In 1910 he published The Rune of the Bunyip and other Verse, and in 1917 a pamphlet, Australian Musical Resources, Some Suggestions, in which he demonstrated the possibility of the developing an Australian school of musical composers with a distinctive national character. He extended this argument in Australian Musical Possibilities, published in Melbourne in 1924. That year he became music critic for The Age.

Musical compositions
Tate's Bush Miniatures was played in Melbourne in 1925. The more ambitious Dawn, an Australian rhapsody for full orchestra with a melodic and rhythmic foundation based on Australian bird calls, was later performed by the university symphony orchestra under Bernard Heinze and was favourably received by both critics and the public.

His 16-part cycle "The Australian" is scored for solo piano, except for the final part, written for unaccompanied four-part male chorus. It received various performances in Tate's lifetime, and the alternative title "Gallipoli" came to be attached to it. Its first modern performance was in 2005, by Ian Munro and members of The Song Company.

Death
The value of Tate's work had scarcely begun to be appreciated when he died after a short illness on 6 June 1926. He was survived by his wife Violet Eleanor, née Mercer, who survived until 1963. They had no children.

Legacy
Tate's poems were collected and published in 1928 with a portrait and an introduction by Elsie Cole.

Thanks to the efforts of Tate's brother-in-law, Ivan Mercer, many of his scores and other papers were donated to the Grainger Museum in Melbourne.

References

1873 births
1926 deaths
Australian poets
Australian writers about music
Australian male composers
Australian composers
People from Prahran, Victoria
Writers from Melbourne
Politicians from Melbourne